Kim Hak-chul, better known by his stage name Kim Yeon-woo (born July 22, 1971) is a South Korean male singer, vocal coach, and professor at Seoul Art College (:ko:서울종합예술학교). Nicknamed God of Vocals, he is well known for his ballads, smooth singing voice, and ability to hit high notes without difficulty. Kim recorded a number of hit ballads with the South Korean band, Toy, in the mid-to-late 1990s, gathering a sizable cult following. In 2011, Kim achieved widespread fame and recognition in South Korea through his participation on I Am a Singer, along with numerous appearances on variety and entertainment shows.

Career
After completing his military service in the Air Force, Kim Yeon-woo participated in the 7th Annual Yoo Jae-ha Music Competition and won the gold prize. In 1996, Kim Yeon-woo became the featured vocal of You Hee-Yeol's project band Toy and adopted his stage name Kim Yeon-woo, which was the name of a café You Hee-Yeol frequented. You had felt that Kim's birth name Kim Hak-chul did not suit him. They went on to record a number of hits such as  Still Beautiful and Remember I Was Next to You.

Since leaving Toy, Kim Yeon-woo has released five solo full albums and two mini albums.

In 2010, Kim was noted in the media thanks to a video of him performing at a university concert back in 2007. He performed in the heavy rain while holding an umbrella, after all the other guest singers had reportedly quit. Because of this, the title of Kim's national concert tour in the summer of 2011 was Yeon-woo in the Rain.

In 2011, Kim was a participant in I Am a Singer. He performed two songs before being voted off. The day after his elimination, the second (and last) song he sang in the contest became number 1 on all music charts in Korea. Kim's popularity started to rise, and he gained widespread recognition from the public, earning the nickname God of Vocals. He also found success in two other guest appearances in the contest. His duet with Kim Kyung Ho was ranked second, and during the Australian contest/concert of the show, Kim was voted first.

This time he was not voted off, and was able to earn honorary graduation by the end of the contest.

The performance was ranked first. Kim's popularity rose even more thanks to his participation in King of Mask Singer. Under the stage name CBR Cleopatra, he became the first male Mask King, as well as the first long-term Mask King, staying on the show for 10 consecutive weeks.

Kim is also well known as a vocal trainer. His former students include SG Wannabe's Lee Seok-hoon, Big Mama's Lee Young-hyun, and Brown Eyed Girls' JeA.

Personal life

Kim studied practical music at Seoul Institute of the Arts.

Kim's best friends include You Hee-yeol, Kim Kyung-ho, and Muzie. He is also close with Sung Si-kyung and K.Will.

Several K-pop idols such as B1A4's Sandeul, Shinee's Onew, and VIXX's Ken have mentioned Kim as their role model.

In 2010, Kim married the daughter of a president of a Korean corporation. At the wedding, You Hee-Yeol was the master of ceremonies and Sung Si-kyung was the wedding singer.

Discography

Studio albums

Extended plays

Singles

Other charted songs

Other activities

Variety and competition shows

Dramas

Awards

References

External links

K-pop singers
Living people
Mystic Entertainment artists
1971 births
21st-century South Korean male singers
20th-century South Korean male singers